The Herring Run is an  tributary of the Back River located in Baltimore, Maryland.

Geography
The  watershed has its headwaters in Towson, Maryland, and flows through Baltimore County and Baltimore City and back into the County before discharging into the Back River, which empties into the Chesapeake Bay. The principal tributaries of Herring Run are the Western Branch, Chinquapin Run, Tiffany Run, Armistead Run, Biddison Run, Moores Run and Redhouse Run.

Herring Run Park
The politician William Smith lived on land now included in the park, which he purchased in 1770.

Water pollution
The Maryland Department of the Environment has listed the Herring Run as an impaired tributary, due to the elevated amounts of fecal coliform bacteria found in it. Nonetheless, efforts continue to improve the stream's water quality.

Herring Run Watershed Association
The Herring Run Watershed Association (HRWA) was founded in 1978 (originally as the Friends of Northeast Parks and Streams) and is now a fully staffed 501(c)(3) nonprofit organization dedicated to stewarding the watershed. Its efforts include stream cleanups; stream plantings; rain barrel distribution; resident education; green jobs creation; advocacy, and running a native plant nursery.

In 2008, HRWA completed construction on the Herring Run Watershed Center, a state-of-the-art green building that serves as the organization's headquarters and education center.  Designed by Ziger/Snead Architects and built by Baltimore Green Construction, the Watershed Center was the first LEED-NC building in Baltimore City, winning a "Gold" designation from the United States Green Building Council.

It merged with four other groups to form Blue Water Baltimore in 2010.

References

Tributaries of the Chesapeake Bay
Bodies of water of Baltimore
Rivers of Maryland